Nadavayal is a small village town near Panamaram in Wayanad district, Kerala, India. This small town hosted early migrants from Travancore (Thiruvithaamkoor).

Migration from Kottayam
Nadavayal is one of the main residential areas in the Wayanad district. Most of them are migrated from Kottayam and Idukki districts. Agriculture is the primary industry and cultivation includes Paddy, Coconut, coffee, pepper, ginger, Cardamom, vanilla, rubber, Arecanut and coco.

Landmarks
Holy Cross Major Archiepiscopal Forane Pilgrim Church is one of the most important churches in Syro-Malabar Catholic Diocese of Mananthavady. St. Thomas Higher Secondary School is one of the most prestigious educational institutions in the district. Ozanam Bhavan of st. Vincent de paul society (The Old age Home in mananthavady diocese).

Notable persons
Mar George Njaralakatt  is the Syro-Malabar Catholic Archbishop of Tellicherry Archdiocese.
The renowned author and activist Sri. K. J. Baby established 'Kanavu' - an alternate system of education for the tribal community in the village of Nadavayal..Kayakkunn, Cheengode, Nelliyambam, Kavadam and Neikuppa are the sub villages of Nadavayal. Annamma Pulivelil (Annammachedathi), from the popular Youtube cooking channel Annammachedathi Special, also resides in this village. She is among the many who migrated here from Kottayam jilla.

Nadavayal town belongs to three panchayaths (Poothady, Kaniyambetta & Panamaram) and three assembly constituencies (Kalpetta, S.Bathery & North Wayanad).

Transportation
Nadavayal village can be accessed from Sulthan's battery, Mananthavady or Kalpetta. The Periya ghat road connects Mananthavady to Kannur and Thalassery.  The Thamarassery mountain road connects Calicut with Kalpetta. The Kuttiady mountain road connects Vatakara with Kalpetta and Mananthavady. The Palchuram mountain road connects Kannur and Iritty with Mananthavady.  The road from Bangalore, Mysore, Gudaloor-nilegirise, Nilambur and Ooty is also connected to Wayanad through Sulthan's battery.

The nearest railway station is at Vadakara and the nearest airports are Kozhikode International Airport-120 km, Bengaluru International Airport-290 km, and   Kannur International Airport, 58 km.

References

External links
 Nadavayal website

Sultan Bathery area
Villages in Wayanad district
Mananthavady Area